Emmanuel Saez (born November 26, 1972) is a French, naturalized American economist who is Professor of Economics at the University of California, Berkeley. His work, done with Thomas Piketty and Gabriel Zucman, includes tracking the incomes of the poor, middle class and rich around the world. Their work shows that top earners in the United States have taken an increasingly larger share of overall income over the last three decades, with almost as much inequality as before the Great Depression. He recommends much higher (marginal) taxes on the rich, up to 70% or 90%. He received the John Bates Clark Medal in 2009, a MacArthur "Genius" Fellowship in 2010, and an honorary degree from Harvard University in 2019.

Research
Emmanuel Saez graduated from the École Normale Supérieure in 1996 where he studied mathematics and economics. He then received his Ph.D. in economics from the Massachusetts Institute of Technology (MIT) in 1999.

Saez has written extensively on the theory of optimal taxation and transfer, addressing topics such as wealth and income inequality, capital income taxation, and retirement. In addition to his theoretical work, he has authored a number of empirical papers, many of them applying the results from his theoretical work to US household data. His focus on the top 0.1% of the income and wealth distribution has led to his political theories about the "great compression" and the "great divergence" and led to significant research on the consensus about the ideal wealth distribution.

Saez's research on wealth and income inequality has largely focused on households at the top of the wealth and income distributions, which make up a significant portion of the US tax base.

Conservative critics, such as James Pethokoukis of the American Enterprise Institute, say that Saez and Piketty measure "market income," the total income before tax excluding income from government. Saez describes it as gross income reported on tax returns before any deductions. This excludes unemployment insurance, welfare payments, food stamps, Medicare, Medicaid, Social Security and employer-provided health insurance. Saez says that these are the best data available, as measured consistently since 1913. Critics say that they exaggerate inequality.

In 2011, Saez and Peter Diamond argued in public media a widely discussed paper that the proper marginal tax rate for North Atlantic societies and especially the United States to impose is 73% (substantially higher than the current 42.5% top US marginal tax rate).

Together with Raj Chetty and others he researched social mobility in the US. They found substantial geographic differences across the country that were correlated with five factors: segregation, income inequality, local school quality, social capital, and family structure.

Awards

John Bates Clark Medal
He was the recipient of the 2009 John Bates Clark Medal, awarded to "that American economist under the age of forty who is judged to have made the most significant contribution to economic thought and knowledge."
Saez's research contributions have been mainly in the field of Public Economics. The 2009 John Bates Clark citation reads:
"[Saez's] work attacks policy questions from both theoretical and empirical perspectives, on the one hand refining
the theory in ways that link the characteristics of optimal policy to measurable aspects of the economy and of
behavior, while on the other hand undertaking careful and creative empirical studies designed to fill the gaps
in measurement identified by the theory.  Through a collection of interrelated papers, he has brought the
theory of taxation closer to practical policy making, and has helped to lead a resurgence of academic interest
in taxation."

MacArthur Fellow
In 2010, the MacArthur Foundation named Saez a MacArthur Fellow for his research into the connection between income and tax policy.

See also
Inequality in the United States
Tax policy and economic inequality in the United States

References

External links
 Emmanuel Saez's homepage
 "Striking it Richer: The Evolution of Top Incomes in the United States" (September 3, 2013)
 Essays on the economics of income taxation, PhD thesis (1999)

1972 births
Living people
21st-century French economists
Neo-Keynesian economists
Public economists
Labor economists
MIT School of Humanities, Arts, and Social Sciences alumni
École Normale Supérieure alumni
Harvard University faculty
University of California, Berkeley faculty
MacArthur Fellows
Fellows of the Econometric Society
Fellows of the American Academy of Arts and Sciences